Kim Boutin (born December 16, 1994) is a Canadian short track speed skater. Boutin won silver in the 1,000 m and bronze in the 500 m and 1,500 m events at the 2018 Winter Olympics at Pyeonchang, Korea. She was the first Canadian female short track speed skater to win three individual Olympic medals in a single Olympics and the first Canadian woman to win an Olympic medal in the 1,500 m. As a result of her three medal performance she was named the flag bearer for Canada at the closing ceremonies for the 2018 Winter Olympics. Boutin has also won junior and senior world championships and World Cup medals.

On November 3, 2019, she set a new world-record time of 41.936 seconds in the women's 500m event, becoming the first woman to skate the 500 in under 42 seconds.

Career

2018 Winter Olympics
Boutin participated as part of Canada's team at the 2018 Winter Olympics. She came in 4th in the Women's 500 m, but following the judge's disqualification of South Korean Choi Min-jeong who finished 2nd in a photo finish, Boutin was awarded the bronze. Reports initially suggested the disqualification was due to contact with race winner Arianna Fontana but were later stated to be due to earlier contact with Boutin. The following day, it was announced that Boutin had been receiving negative comments from South Koreans, including reports of death threats. The Canadian Olympic Committee took the threats very seriously and the Royal Canadian Mounted Police were investigating the incidents. It was an emotional and painful experience for the skater, and upon receiving her medal, she was photographed in tears. She said later of it all that "it was pretty tough. I'm a sensitive person."

Boutin started in the 1,500 m heats with the threats still looming over her. She said that "of course, it scared me, and just after my warm-up, I cried. I cried a lot because I was scared. But I have a pretty awesome team behind me." She would put that fear behind her in the final of the 1,500 m when she skated out in front and led the pack until the second last lap when she was passed by Choi but hung on for the bronze medal. This was her second individual medal of the games and made her the first female Canadian short track speed skater to win two individual medals in a single Olympics. Boutin would go on to win silver in the 1,000m race a few days later, earning a medal in all three individual distances. The Canadian team made the relay finals but after being tripped up by the Korean team and the chaos that followed the Canadian women finished off the Olympic relay podium for the first time ever.  As a result of her three individual short track medals, the first time ever by a Canadian female short track speed skater, Boutin was named the flag bearer for the closing ceremonies.

2022 Winter Olympics
On January 18, 2022, Boutin was named to Canada's 2022 Olympic team. At the Olympics, Boutin won the bronze medal in the 500 metres event, matching her performance from four years prior. Later in the season, Boutin would win a silver medal in the 500 m and 1500 m at the 2022 World Short Track Speed Skating Championships.

References

External links

1994 births
Living people
Canadian female speed skaters
Canadian female short track speed skaters
Olympic short track speed skaters of Canada
Olympic medalists in short track speed skating
Olympic silver medalists for Canada
Olympic bronze medalists for Canada
Short track speed skaters at the 2018 Winter Olympics
Short track speed skaters at the 2022 Winter Olympics
Medalists at the 2018 Winter Olympics
Medalists at the 2022 Winter Olympics
Sportspeople from Sherbrooke
World Short Track Speed Skating Championships medalists
21st-century Canadian women